Unity is a small political party in Sweden. The party was founded on 6 April 1990 on the initiative of Ulf Wåhlström. It started with some influences from New Age and spirituality, but is nowadays a political party mostly focused on the environment, an unconditional income floor with a basic income and alternative medicine. The party has taken part in every national election in Sweden since 1991, mostly with limited success. The election 2014 was the best so far, with 0.1 percent of the total votes. In the Swedish national election 2018 the party received 0.06 percent of the total votes.

History 
Starting as a smaller movement in April 1990, on the initiative of Ulf Wåhlström, Enhet then turned into a political party shortly after. In the 2006 parliamentary elections the party got 2,648 votes (0.05%), up from 603 votes (.01%) in the 2002 elections. However, in the 2010 Swedish general election the party only received 463 votes (.01%) this was down 2,616 votes or 0.04%. They bumped back in the 2014 parliamentary elections by getting a total of 6,277 votes or .10%.

Political ideas

The economy 
Enhet emphasizes the need for a sustainable economics with less consumption and pollution. They also believe in the need for structural changes to ascieve this. Two of their main proposals is basic income (of some sort) and a land value tax.

Defence and foreign policy 

Enhet's vision is a world without weapons. Hence they want global disarmament and that Sweden takes a leading role in this process. They also want Sweden out of the European Union and debt relief for poor countries.

Results (number of votes) in the general election of Sweden

References

External links
 enhet.se

1990 establishments in Sweden
Political parties supporting universal basic income
Minor political parties in Sweden
Political parties established in 1990
Pacifist parties
Western spiritually leaning parties